James Matthew Craig (born 2 March 1977, Glasgow, Scotland) is a Scottish former international rugby union player.

He also played for the amateur club West of Scotland and professionally for the provincial side Glasgow Warriors.

James Craig is the son of Jim Craig, who played football for Celtic FC, and was capped for the Scotland national football team in 1967.

References
 Bath, Richard (ed.) The Scotland Rugby Miscellany (Vision Sports Publishing Ltd, 2007 )

1977 births
Living people
Scottish rugby union players
Scotland international rugby union players
Rugby union players from Glasgow
West of Scotland FC players
Glasgow Warriors players
Rugby union wings